Castiello Bernueces is a parish of the municipality of Gijón / Xixón, in Asturias, Spain.

Its population was 740 in 2003 and 1,070 in 2012.

A traditionally rural area, nowadays mainly residential, Castiello Bernueces is located on south of the city and borders Vega, Santurio and Granda in the south, and Somió and Cabueñes in the northeastern side.

In this parish is located the local Campus of the University of Oviedo.

Villages and their neighbourhoods
Castiello Bernueces
El Barriu Baxo
El Cerrucu
El Curullu
La Gayola
El Pradón
El Barriu Riba
Cadrecha
La Madalena
Los Maizales
Les Mestes
Viñao
Xigueo
El Campón

Nativos
 Demetrio González

External links
 Official Toponyms - Principality of Asturias website.
 Official Toponyms: Laws - BOPA Nº 229 - Martes, 3 de octubre de 2006 & DECRETO 105/2006, de 20 de septiembre, por el que se determinan los topónimos oficiales del concejo de Gijón.

Parishes in Gijón